Bak Keon-woo (born 9 August 2001) is a South Korean footballer who currently plays as a right-back for Sagan Tosu, on loan from Pohang Steelers.

Club career
In July 2022, Bak was loaned to Japanese J1 League side Sagan Tosu on a five-month deal.

Career statistics

Club

Notes

References

2001 births
Living people
Korea University alumni
South Korean footballers
South Korea youth international footballers
Association football defenders
J1 League players
Pohang Steelers players
Sagan Tosu players
South Korean expatriate footballers
South Korean expatriate sportspeople in Japan
Expatriate footballers in Japan